The Château d'Uriage is an historic castle in Saint-Martin-d'Uriage, Isère, Rhône-Alpes, France.

History

The castle was built in the 15th and 16th centuries.

From summer 1940 to December 1942, the château was home to the Ecole Nationale des Cadres de la Jeunesse, a training school for the French elite inspired by the Revolution nationale heralded by Marshal Philippe Pétain.

In the late 1980s, it was transformed into a co-ownership of 50 flats, making it a private property. Following a vote from the co-owners, the castle grounds are open to the public one or two days a year, on the European Heritage Days.

Architectural significance
It has been listed as an official monument since 1990.

References

Châteaux in Isère
Chateau Uriage
Monuments historiques of Isère